The 1995 UEFA Women's Championship was a women's association football tournament which was held between 11 December 1994 and 26 March 1995, involving UEFA-affiliated national teams who have qualified for the competition.

Germany won the competition for the third time.

Format
In the qualifying round, 29 teams were divided into 8 groups (containing 3 or 4 teams), with the winners of each group advancing to the quarter-finals. In the quarter-finals and semi-finals, matches were played on a home-and-away two-legged basis. In the final, only one match was played, with the winner claiming the UEFA Women's Championship title. While one of the semi-final matches was played in 1994, and there was no singular host, UEFA considers the semi-finals and final as part of the final tournament.

Qualification

Squads
For a list of all squads that played in the final tournament, see 1995 UEFA Women's Championship squads

Bracket

Results

Semifinals

First leg

Second leg

Germany won 6–2 on aggregate.

Sweden won 7–5 on aggregate.

Final

Awards

Goalscorers
3 goals
  Lena Videkull

2 goals

  Karen Farley
  Heidi Mohr
  Birgit Prinz
  Bettina Wiegmann
  Ann Kristin Aarønes
  Anneli Andelén
  Ulrika Kalte

1 goal

  Maren Meinert
  Patricia Brocker
  Linda Medalen
  Kristin Sandberg
  Anita Waage
  Malin Andersson
  Helen Johansson

Own goal
  Louise Waller (playing against Germany)

See also
UEFA Women's Championship
Women's football (soccer)

References

External links
Women's Euro 1995 Results - UEFA Official Page
Results at RSSSF

 
Women
1995
1995 FIFA Women's World Cup qualification
1995
UEFA
Euro
1995 in Norwegian women's football
1995 in Swedish women's football
1994–95 in English women's football
1995
1995
1995